Aaron Robertson may be:
Aaron Robertson (mathematician)
Aaron Robertson, drummer for the band Myka Relocate